Patricia Marie MacLachlan ( Pritzkau; March 3, 1938 – March 31, 2022) was an American children's writer. She was noted for her novel Sarah, Plain and Tall, which won the 1986 Newbery Medal.

Early life
MacLachlan  was born in Cheyenne, Wyoming, on March 3, 1938.  Her father, Philo, was a professor of philosophy of education; her mother, Madonna, was an American English teacher before becoming a homemaker.  Her family moved to Rochester, Minnesota, when she was five years old, then relocating to Connecticut after she completed elementary as well as middle school.  MacLachlan later studied English at the University of Connecticut, graduating with a bachelor's degree in 1962.

Career
MacLachlan first worked as an English teacher at Bennett Junior High School in Manchester, Connecticut from 1963 until 1979.  She was also employed by a family services agency during this time.  She then began writing at the age of 35, after her children started attending school.  She published her first volume, The Sick Day, in 1979, with her first novel, Arthur, for the Very First Time, being released the following year.  Six years later, she was awarded the Newbery Medal for her book Sarah, Plain and Tall.  It was adapted as a TV movie by the same name in 1991, starring Glenn Close and Christopher Walken, with MacLachlan as one of its screenwriters.  The two actors subsequently reprised their roles in the sequel Skylark two years later.  Her novels Journey (1991) and Baby (1993) were also adapted for TV in 1995 and 2000, respectively.

MacLachlan ultimately authored over 60 children's books throughout her career.  She collaborated with her daughter, Emily MacLachlan Charest, to create several picture books during the latter part of her career.  These included Once I Ate a Pie (2006), Fiona Loves the Night (2007), I Didn't Do It (2010), Cat Talk (2013), and Little Robot Alone.  MacLachlan received a National Humanities Medal in 2002.  She was a board member of the National Children's Book and Literacy Alliance, a national not-for-profit that actively advocates for literacy, literature, and libraries.

Personal life
MacLachlan married Robert MacLachlan in 1962.  They met while she was studying at the University of Connecticut, and remained married until his death in 2015.  Together, they had three children: John, Emily, and Jamison. She resided in western Massachusetts and kept a small bag of dirt from the prairies to call to mind her Wyoming roots.

Patricia MacLachlan died on March 31, 2022, at her home in Williamsburg, Massachusetts.  She was 84 years old.

Novels
Sarah, Plain and Tall series, of the Witting family
 Sarah, Plain and Tall (April 1985) — winner of the 1986 Newbery Medal
 Skylark (March 1994) 
 Caleb's Story (October 2001) 
 More Perfect Than the Moon (2004) 
 Grandfather's Dance (2009)

Other
 Arthur, for the Very First Time (1980) 
 Through Grandpa's Eyes (March 1980) 
 Mama One, Mama Two (1982) 
 Tomorrow's Wizard (1982) 
 Cassie Binegar (October 1982) 
 Seven Kisses in a Row (March 1983) 
 Unclaimed Treasures (July 1987) 
 The Facts and Fictions of Minna Pratt (July 1988) 
 Journey (September 1991) 
 Three Names (September 1991) 
 Baby (October 1993) 
 All the Places to Love (May 1994) 
 What You Know First (September 1995) 
 The Sick Day (April 2001) 
 Edward's Eyes (August 2007) 
 True Gift: A Christmas Story (October 2009) 
 Before You Came (2011) 
 Cat Talk (2013)  (Illustrated by Barry Moser)
 Nora's Chicks (2013)  (Illustrated by Kathryn Brown)
 The Iridescence of Birds: A Book About Henri Matisse (October 2014) 
 The Truth of Me (January 2015) 
 Poets Dog (September 4th 2018) 
 Wondrous Rex (March 17th 2020) 
 Waiting for Magic (September 18th 2012) 
 White Fur Flying (April 8th 2018) 
 Dream Within a Dream (June 23rd 2020) 
 My Life Begins (2022)
 Snow Horses: A First Night Story (8 Nov 2022)  or

See also

References

External links

1938 births
2022 deaths
20th-century American novelists
20th-century American women writers
21st-century American novelists
21st-century American women writers
American children's writers
American historical novelists
American women children's writers
American women novelists
National Humanities Medal recipients
Newbery Medal winners
Novelists from Massachusetts
Novelists from Wyoming
People from Cheyenne, Wyoming
People from Hampshire County, Massachusetts
University of Connecticut alumni
Women historical novelists